Phyllonorycter myricella is a moth of the family Gracillariidae. It is known from Kedah, Malaysia.

The wingspan is 5.1-5.7 mm.

The larvae feed on Myrica esculenta. They mine the leaves of their host plant. The mine has the form of a tentiform blotch-mine occurring upon the upper side of the leaf, usually situated on the disc between two lateral veins. It is oval or elliptical in outline. The upper epidermis of the mine is brownish, with a longitudinal, strong wrinkle at maturity. Pupation takes place inside the mine-cavity, without a particular cocoon.

References

myricella
Moths of Asia
Moths described in 1995